Events from the year 1645 in Denmark.

Incumbents 

 Monarch — Christian IV
 Steward of the Realm — Corfitz Ulfeldt

Events 
 3 March — Simon Paulli gives his first public lecture in the new Domus Anatomica in Copenhagen.
 25 May   sinks near Buskär outside the harbour of Gothenburg.
 13 August — The Second Treaty of Brömsebro is signed, putting an end to the Torstenson War. The island Øsel is ceded to Sweden.

Undated
 Stephanius publishes Saxonis Grammatici Historiæ Danicæ Libri XVI, a Latin edition of Saxo Grammaticus's Gesta Danorum.

Culture

Art
 Abraham Wuchters creates a full-length portrait of Ulrik Christian Gyldenløve.

Births

Deaths 
 January 31 — Hans Ulrik Gyldenløve, diplomat, illegitimate son of Christian IV

References 

 
Denmark
Years of the 17th century in Denmark